Aloisio Ilaisa Ma'asi (born 5 February 1982 in Tofoa, Tonga) is a Tongan rugby union player. He plays Hooker for Tonga on international level. Ma'asi also played for Counties Manukau in their ITM Cup campaign from 2007 to 2010.

Ma'asi made his debut for the national side against Fiji in June 2009 crossing the line two Tests later against Japan. He found his way back into the international side for their 2011 Churchill Cup campaign before turning out for the national side in the Pacific Nations Cup. He also was a part of the squad in the 2011 Rugby World Cup making two appearances.

In June 2014 he was named to the Pacific barbarians team to play against Tonga.

References

External links
espnscrum.com profile
itsrugby.co.uk profile

Tongan rugby union players
Tonga international rugby union players
Tongan expatriate rugby union players
Expatriate rugby union players in New Zealand
Tongan expatriate sportspeople in New Zealand
1982 births
Living people
People from Tongatapu
Rugby union hookers